Tacuba is a station of the Mexico City Metro. It is  located in the Tacuba district of the Miguel Hidalgo borough, to the west of downtown Mexico City. It lies along Lines 2 and 7.

The station logo depicts three flowers, as its name comes from the Nahuatl language word tlacopan, that which means "land of flowers". It refers to the ancient Tepanec kingdom of Tlacopan that existed in the area in pre-Columbian times.

This transfer station was previously the terminal for Metro Line 2 and opened for service along that line on 14 September 1970.  Service was extended westward along Line 2 from Tacuba to Panteones and Cuatro Caminos on 22 August 1984.  Line 7 opened up through Tacuba on 20 December 1984. The station transfers not only to Line 7 but also to a nearby mini-bus base, which serves boroughs Azcapotzalco and Miguel Hidalgo. Within the station facilities there is a cultural display and an information desk.

Ridership

Nearby
Mercado Tacuba, market

Exits

Line 2
North: Calzada México-Tacuba, Tacuba

Line 7
East: Calzada México-Tacuba and Golfo de Bengala, Tacuba
West: Golfo de México and Golfo de Bengala, Tacuba

See also
List of Mexico City metro stations

References

External links 

Mexico City Metro Line 2 stations
Mexico City Metro Line 7 stations
Mexico City Metro stations in Miguel Hidalgo, Mexico City
Railway stations opened in 1970
1970  establishments in Mexico
Railway stations opened in 1984
1984 establishments in Mexico
Accessible Mexico City Metro stations